Oakfield is an unincorporated community in Trumbull County, in the U.S. state of Ohio.

History
Oakfield was laid out in 1838. A post office was established at Oakfield in 1845, and remained in operation until 1874.

References

Unincorporated communities in Perry County, Ohio
Unincorporated communities in Ohio
1838 establishments in Ohio